Travian may refer to:
 Travian, a browser game
 Travian Games, a German browser game developer
 Travian Robertson, an American football player
 Travian Smith, a former American football player